Mitchell Guitar (born September 22, 1997) is an American soccer player.

Career

Youth
Guitar played with Vardar Soccer Club for seven years, helping the team qualify for the USSF Academy playoffs every year.

College & amateur
In 2016 Guitar attended the University of Wisconsin, where he made 58 appearances, scored 2 goals and tallied 5 assists for the Badgers over four seasons, although missing his entire senior season in 2019 due to injury. Guitar helped the team capture the Big Ten Tournament Championship in 2017 and in 2018 was named to the All-Big Ten Second Team.

In 2018, Guitar played with USL PDL side Flint City Bucks, appearing in 10 games and finishing with a single assist.

Professional
On September 21, 2020, Guitar signed with USL Championship side Indy Eleven. Despite being signed to the Indy Eleven roster for 2021, Guitar was eligible in the 2021 MLS SuperDraft and was selected 60th overall by Chicago Fire. However, he was not signed by the club.

On March 15, 2021, Guitar was traded to fellow USL Championship side Memphis 901. He made his professional debut on May 15, 2021, appearing as a 83rd-minute substitute during a 1–0 loss to rivals Birmingham Legion.

References

1997 births
Living people
American soccer players
Association football midfielders
Chicago Fire FC draft picks
Flint City Bucks players
Indy Eleven players
Memphis 901 FC players
People from Royal Oak, Michigan
People from Troy, Michigan
Soccer players from Michigan
Sportspeople from Royal Oak, Michigan
USL League Two players
USL Championship players
Wisconsin Badgers men's soccer players